Dreuil-lès-Amiens is a railway station located in the commune of Dreuil-lès-Amiens in the Somme department, France.  The station is served by TER Hauts-de-France trains (Abbeville - Amiens - Albert line).

See also
List of SNCF stations in Hauts-de-France

References

Railway stations in Somme (department)